Thesprotia caribea, the Caribbean grass mantis, is a species of praying mantis found in Antigua and Jamaica.

References

Caribea
Mantodea of North America
Insects of Antigua and Barbuda
Insects of Jamaica
Insects described in 1938